Mikael Högberg (born 4 October 1960) is a retired Swedish professional golfer. He won the Swedish Golf Tour Order of Merit in 1990 and joined the European Tour in 1991.

Amateur career
Högberg finished fourth at the 1982 European Youths' Team Championship and won the 1983 Swedish International Stroke Play Championship. He represented Sweden at the 1984 Eisenhower Trophy and finished 8th together with Carl-Magnus Strömberg and Jesper Parnevik. He represented the Continent of Europe at the 1984 St Andrews Trophy at Saunton Golf Club with a team that included Fredrik Lindgren and José María Olazábal.

Professional career
Högberg turned professional in 1986 and joined the Swedish Golf Tour. In his first season, he won the Esab Open and finished T9 in the Scandinavian Enterprise Open, a European Tour event.

In 1990, he won the Teleannons Grand Prix on the nascent Challenge Tour, and he won the 1990 Swedish Golf Tour Order of Merit.

Högberg joined the European Tour in 1991, where he made 9 cuts in 17 starts and finished 142nd in the rankings.

Amateur wins
1983 Swedish International Stroke Play Championship

Professional wins (2)

Challenge Tour wins (1)

Swedish Golf Tour wins (1)

Team appearances
Amateur
European Youths' Team Championship (representing Sweden): 1982
Eisenhower Trophy (representing Sweden): 1984
St Andrews Trophy (representing the Continent of Europe): 1984

Source:

References

External links

Swedish male golfers
European Tour golfers
Sportspeople from Södermanland County
People from Eskilstuna
1960 births
Living people
20th-century Swedish people